Adinadu  is a village in Kollam district in the state of Kerala, India. Adinadu is included in the Kulasekharapuram panchayath.

References

Villages in Kollam district
Cities and towns in Kollam district